Kate Goodfellow (born August 12, 1989) is a Canadian rower from Lanark County, Ontario. She competed at several World cups, international events, along with the 2015 Pan American Games. Goodfellow is a former world championships silver medalist in the women's quadruple sculls event.

References

1989 births
Living people
Rowers at the 2015 Pan American Games
World Rowing Championships medalists for Canada
Canadian female rowers
Pan American Games gold medalists for Canada
Pan American Games medalists in rowing
Medalists at the 2015 Pan American Games
21st-century Canadian women